Joke Silva MFR is a Nigerian actress, director, and businesswoman.

In 1998 she had a major role, starring opposite Colin Firth and Nia Long in the British-Canadian film The Secret Laughter of Women. In 2006, she won "Best Actress in a Leading Role" at the 2nd Africa Movie Academy Awards for her performance in Women's Cot, and "Best Actress in a Supporting Role" at the 4th Africa Movie Academy Awards in 2008 for her performance as a grandmother in White Waters.

Silva is married to actor Olu Jacobs. The couple founded and operate the Lufodo Group, a media corporation that consists of film production, distribution assets,  and the Lufodo Academy of Performing Arts where she serves as Director of Studies. She is also the pioneer managing director of Malete Film Village, in association with Kwara State University.

On 29 September 2014, Silva received recognition as a Member of the Order of the Federal Republic, one of Nigeria's National Honours, at the International Conference Centre in Abuja.

Early life 
Silva was born in Lagos, Nigeria  into a Saro/Amaro family of four children. Her mother, the pioneering doctor Adebimbola Silva, died in July 2015. Her father, Chief Emmanuel Afolabi Silva, was a lawyer, and her great-grandfathers were the prominent Colonial Nigerians Charles Phillips and Samuel Herbert Pearse.

Education
Silva attended Holy Child College in Lagos.
A graduate of the University of Lagos and the Webber Douglas Academy of Dramatic Art in London, Silva began her career in film in the early 1990s. At university she was part of a cultural group that included the playwright Bode Osanyin and the singer Stella Monye. She took a year off from her studies, during which time she began working as an actress  before relocating to England where she studied Drama at the Webber Douglas Academy of Dramatic Art in London. Initially, her parents were opposed to Silva's decision to go into the theatre but they soon began to support her, happy at the success she made of her career. During a slow period of her career, Silva returned to school, studying English at the University of Lagos.

Career

Earlier roles (1990–2004)
Silva has starred in numerous films and television series in both the English and Yoruba languages. One of her earliest roles was in the 1990 English television series Mind Bending.
In 1993 she appeared in Owulorojo, followed by Violated in 1996. In 1998 she starred opposite Colin Firth and Nia Long in the British-Canadian film The Secret Laughter of Women, in which she portrayed Nene. Author Finola Kerrigan noted that Silva stood out as an exceptional actress in the Nigerian film industry after mentioning her role.

In 2002, Silva starred opposite Bimbo Akintola in Keeping Faith. Akintola later cited Silva, whom she refers to as "Aunty Joke", as a major career influence, adding, "Silva has done a lot, but it's not even about the things that she did, it's about the things she didn't realize that she did". Also in 2002, Silva co-produced and starred in The Kingmaker with Olu Jacobs. This was followed by roles in pictures such as A Husband's Wife (2003), Shylock (2004), and A Past Came Calling (2004).

Critical success (2006–present)
In 2006, Silva was awarded the "Best Actress in a Leading Role" award at the 2nd Africa Movie Academy Awards for her role in Women's Cot.
Later that year, Silva starred opposite Genevieve Nnaji in Mildred Okwo's action thriller 30 Days, which received 10 nominations at the Africa Movie Academy Awards in 2008. 
She also narrated Jeta Amata's Anglo-Nigerian production The Amazing Grace, which was shot in Calabar. The film was lauded by critics, and was nominated for 11 African Movie Academy Awards. The News noted Silva's "song-like voice, [which] provides insight to the actions".

In 2007, Silva starred opposite Kate Henshaw-Nuttal, Michael Okon and Fred Essien in Ndubuisi Okoh's To Love and to Hold. Silva won a Best Supporting Actress award in 2008 for her "methodical portrayal of a grandmother" in White Waters (2007), though she was not at the ceremony to receive her award in person.
In a November 2008 interview, Silva professed that "whenever she had to play an evil character in a film, she would pray and use Jesus as her 'hedge'". Silva is also the recipient of an EMOTAN Award from African Independent Television (AIT) and the SOLIDRA Award for Visual Art.

In 2011, Silva starred alongside Nse Ikpe Etim, Wale Ojo and Lydia Forson in Kunle Afolayan's romantic comedy Phone Swap. Lauded by the critics, and one of the most eagerly awaited films of the year, it received four nominations at the 8th Africa Movie Academy Awards, including a nomination for Best Nigerian Film. It also won the award for Achievement in Productions Design. In 2013, Silva took to the stage to appear in the Thespian Family Theatre and Productions staging of the "Mad King of Ijudiya" at the Agip Hall of Muson Centre of Lagos at Christmas. Two shows were put up at 3:00pm and 6:00pm on 21, 22, 28 and 29 December, which Vanguard described as a "rich blend of folklore, traditional dance and music that naturally transports the audience to a typical African village setting".

United Nations Goodwill Ambassador
In October 2012, the United Nations Office on Drugs and Crime appointed Silva goodwill ambassador. In accordance with the UN policy of enlisting prominent figures in art, music, film, sport and literature to assist with their campaigns, her role was focused on her participation in the fight against human trafficking in Nigeria. Work fighting human trafficking was part of the "I Am Priceless" campaign, which had also received support from the Nigerian authorities. Silva's appointment was for a period of three years.

Personal life 

Silva is married to veteran actor Olu Jacobs and has two children. The couple met in 1981 at the National Theatre, Lagos during the 21st Independence anniversary.

Silva is Director of Studies at the Lufodo Academy of Performing Arts, while her husband served as chairman. Lufodo Academy as one of several assets the couple own as part of the Lufodo Group, including Lufodo Productions, Lufodo Consult, and Lufodo Distribution. She has curated for the Bank of Industry (BOI) in Theatre, Film, Documentary and Poetry and the 2012 London Olympics, and is also the pioneer managing director of Malete Film Village, in association with Kwara State University.

In addition to her work as an actress, Silva is a philanthropist and a strong supporter of women's emancipation and empowerment, contributing to their education, training and progress.

On 29 September 2014, Silva was honored as a Member of the Order of the Federal Republic, one of Nigeria's national honors, at the International Conference Centre in Abuja. In September 2016, she was unveiled as the brand ambassador for AIICO Pension Managers Limited (APML).

Silva, in the year 2020, led the campaign supporting ailing Nigerian actors soliciting for funds to pay for medical bills. She did that through the instance of the Actors Guild of Nigeria, AGN, which revealed plans to inaugurate health insurance schemes for its members. In November 2021 Joke had an interview with Chude Jideonwo where she revealed that her husband Jacobs is battling with Dementia with Lewy bodies. In 2022, she was appointed into Tinubu/Shettima Women Presidential Campaign Team.

Selected filmography
Laughter of Women (1999)
Last Wedding (2004) 
Women's Cot (2005) 
30 Days (2006) 
 Eewo Orisa (2007)
The Secret
The Royal Hibiscus Hotel (2017)
Potato Potahto (2017)
Chief Daddy (2018)
Light In The Dark (2019)
Diamonds in the Sky (2019)
Two Weeks in Lagos (2019)
Namaste Wahala (2021)
Chief Daddy 2: Going for Broke
Elesin Oba, The King's Horseman (2022)

TelevisionBattleground'' (2017-2018)

See also
List of Yoruba people
 List of Nigerian actresses
 List of Nigerian philanthropists

References

Bibliography

External links
 
 

Living people
Actresses from Lagos
Yoruba actresses
Nigerian film directors
University of Lagos alumni
Alumni of the Webber Douglas Academy of Dramatic Art
20th-century Nigerian actresses
21st-century Nigerian actresses
Best Supporting Actress Africa Movie Academy Award winners
Actresses in Yoruba cinema
Nigerian expatriates in the United Kingdom
Nigerian theatre managers and producers
Yoruba women in business
Nigerian stage actresses
Businesspeople from Lagos
Members of the Order of the Federal Republic
Nigerian officials of the United Nations
Holy Child College alumni
Nigerian businesspeople
Nigerian women in business
Year of birth missing (living people)